The Time Bender is the first single from the album I Am by Christian metal band Becoming the Archetype. It was released on August 28, 2012, through Solid State. It was produced by Shane Frisby.

Music video
The video was released on the band's channel and the record channel on YouTube. The video is filmed on Film noir and makes references to Frank Miller's comic book Sin City and created by Miller himself, also contains dialogue as comic books, and the band looks for their instruments to keep playing, but are hidden in a castle.

Personnel

Becoming the Archetype
 Chris McCane - lead vocals
 Daniel Gailey – lead guitar, vocals
 Seth Hecox – rhythm guitar, keyboards, clean vocals
 Codey Watkins – bass, vocals
 Chris Heaton – drums, percussion

Production and recording
 Shane Frisby - producer
 Tue Madsen - mixing
 Troy Glessnar - mastering

References

2012 singles
2012 songs
Solid State Records singles